Phaeomyces is a genus of fungi in the family Tubariaceae. The genus contains two species found in Europe.

References

External links

Agaricales genera
Tubariaceae